Jennifer Victoria Runyon (born April 1, 1960) is an American actress. She made her feature-film debut in the slasher film To All a Goodnight (1980), and went on to have supporting roles in the comedies Up the Creek (1984) and Ghostbusters (1984). She also had a lead role as Gwendolyn Pierce in the 1984 sitcom Charles in Charge during its first season. In 1988, she portrayed Cindy Brady in the television film A Very Brady Christmas.

Early life
Runyon was born in Chicago, Illinois, the daughter of radio announcer and disc jockey Jim Runyon, and actress Jane Roberts. She has one half-brother, Scott, from her father's first marriage. Runyon grew up in various cities in the United States, as her father's disc-jockey career required the family to move frequently. The family eventually settled in Los Angeles when Runyon was 14 years old.

Career
Runyon made her feature-film debut in the slasher film To All a Goodnight (1980), about a group of school girls stalked by a killer in a Santa Claus costume. She was subsequently cast in a supporting role as Sally Frame on the soap opera Another World, which she taped in New York from March 1981 until February 1983. She had a small part as a student being given an ESP test by Bill Murray's character in Ghostbusters (1984), and starred in Up the Creek that same year, the latter of which she filmed over several weeks in Bend, Oregon. She later appeared on television as Gwendolyn Pierce in the sitcom Charles in Charge (1984–1985), and replaced Susan Olsen as Cindy Brady in the television film A Very Brady Christmas (1988).

She was a guest on Beverly Hills, 90210 in 1991. In 1988, Runyon played the lead in The In Crowd and was in the pilot of Quantum Leap. She also starred in the comedy 18 Again!. She also appeared in Murder, She Wrote in the 1989 episode, "Seal of the Confessional" playing the character Kelly Barret alongside leading role Angela Lansbury. 
In 1990 she played a supporting role in the World War II parody A Man Called Sarge, produced by the brother of Roger Corman, Gene Corman, father of her husband Todd Corman.

Personal life
Runyon married film and television director and collegiate basketball coach Todd Corman on March 9, 1991. Corman served as head coach of the Loyola Marymount women's basketball team from 1985 to 1995. He coached at Albertson College from 1996 to 2001. Beginning in 2001, he was the assistant coach of the women's basketball team at Oregon State University. The couple have a son, Wyatt, and a daughter, Bayley.

In a 2014 interview, Runyon stated she was semiretired from acting, and instead working as a teacher; she also stated that she co-hosted her own cooking podcast.

Filmography

Film

Television

References

External links

1960 births
20th-century American actresses
21st-century American actresses
Actresses from Chicago
American film actresses
American soap opera actresses
American television actresses
Living people